Loredana Trigilia (born 25 January 1976) is an Italian wheelchair fencer. She competed at the 2016 Summer Paralympics, winning a bronze medal in Women's team foil, and at the 2020 Summer Paralympics, winning a silver medal in Women's foil team.

Career
She competed at six editions of Summer Paralympics from Sydney 2000 to Tokyo 2020.

In addition at the two Paralympic medals, Trigilia also won seven world championships medals and eight European championships medals.

Achievements

References

External links
 

1976 births
Living people
Italian female fencers
Wheelchair fencers
Paralympic wheelchair fencers of Italy
Paralympic silver medalists for Italy
Paralympic bronze medalists for Italy
Paralympic medalists in wheelchair fencing
Medalists at the 2016 Summer Paralympics
Medalists at the 2020 Summer Paralympics
Wheelchair fencers at the 2000 Summer Paralympics
Wheelchair fencers at the 2004 Summer Paralympics
Wheelchair fencers at the 2008 Summer Paralympics
Wheelchair fencers at the 2012 Summer Paralympics
Wheelchair fencers at the 2016 Summer Paralympics
Wheelchair fencers at the 2020 Summer Paralympics
Sportspeople from the Province of Syracuse
20th-century Italian women
21st-century Italian women